Peyton Ferdinand St. Clair (August 15, 1860 – August 17, 1914) was an American politician who served as a member of the Virginia Senate.

References

External links
 
 

1860 births
1914 deaths
Democratic Party Virginia state senators
20th-century American politicians